Anthophora californica is a species of anthophorine bee in the family Apidae. It is found in Central America and North America.

Subspecies
These two subspecies belong to the species Anthophora californica:
 Anthophora californica albomarginata  Timberlake, 1937
 Anthophora californica californica'' Cresson, 1869

References

Further reading

External links

 

Apinae
Articles created by Qbugbot
Insects described in 1869